The Uttar Pradesh cricket team, formerly United Provinces Cricket Team, is a domestic cricket team which is based in the Indian state of Uttar Pradesh, run by the Uttar Pradesh Cricket Association. The team competes in the first-class cricket tournament Ranji Trophy and limited-overs Vijay Hazare Trophy and Syed Mushtaq Ali Trophy. They have won the Ranji Trophy in 2005–06 and have been runners-up on five occasions. Cricketers such as Suresh Raina, Mohammad Kaif, Piyush Chawla, Praveen Kumar, Bhuvneshwar Kumar, Kuldeep Yadav and Sudeep Tyagi have passed through Uttar Pradesh and gone on to represent India.

Competition history

The team was formed in 1934 under the name of "United Provinces". The team's best performance in the Ranji Trophy in their early years came in 1939–40 when they finished as runners-up. In the 1950–51 season, the team's name was changed to "Uttar Pradesh".

Uttar Pradesh have not been strong in the Ranji Trophy cricket for any prolonged period in their history. Their only victory in the Ranji Trophy Elite Group was in the 2005–06 season. The Ranji Trophy win was one of the most spectacular comebacks in cricketing history, since at one point of time in the season Uttar Pradesh were on the brink of relegation.

They have finished runner-up twice before, once in 1997–98 against a strong Karnataka side, and once in 1977–78 against the same team under the captaincy of Mohammad Shahid and team manager was Karim Chishti, former captain Uttar Pradesh. They finished runners-up in the 2007–08 season, reprising a performance, similar to the one witnessed in the 2005–06 season, when they came back from the brink of relegation to win the championship. This time though, they lost to Delhi in the final.

This season's stellar performers were Mohammad Kaif, their captain who finished as the season's 3rd highest run-getter, medium pacer Sudeep Tyagi, season's 2nd highest wicket taker and Praveen Kumar who took 8 wickets in the Ranji Trophy final.

Their best performance in the Vijay Hazare Trophy came in 2004–05 when they were joint-winners with Tamil Nadu. In 2006 they won the Nissar Trophy, defeating Sialkot cricket team in Dharmasala. Their only appearance in the Irani Trophy came in the 2006–07 season in which they lost to the Rest of India team.

Best performances in Ranji Trophy (in final)

Best performances in Vijay Hazare Trophy (in final)

Notable players

Players from Uttar Pradesh who have played Test cricket for India, along with year of Test debut:
 Gopal Sharma (1985)
 Mohammad Kaif (2000)
 Nikhil Chopra (2000)
 Rudra Pratap Singh (2006)
 Piyush Chawla (2006)
 Suresh Raina (2010)
 Praveen Kumar (2011)
 Bhuvneshwar Kumar (2013)
 Kuldeep Yadav (2017)

Players from Uttar Pradesh who have played ODI but not Test cricket for India, along with year of ODI debut :

 Rudra Pratap Singh (1986)
 Gyanendra Pandey (1999)
 Sudeep Tyagi (2009)

Players from Uttar Pradesh who have played T20I but not Test or ODI cricket for India, along with year of T20I debut :

 Shivam Mavi (2023)

Current squad 
Players with international caps are listed in bold.

Updated as on 24 January 2023

Coaching staff

 Head coach: Vijay Dahiya
 Assistant coach: Vikramjeet Malik
 Trainer: Rashid Zirak
 Physio: Zeeshan Rais
 Manager:Dipannakar Malviya
 Video analyst : Subbarao
 Fielding Coach : Musi Raza

See also

 Uttar Pradesh Cricket Association
 Green Park Stadium
 Ekana International Cricket Stadium
 Saifai International Cricket Stadium

References

1903 establishments in India
Indian first-class cricket teams
Cricket in Uttar Pradesh
Cricket clubs established in 1903